Ptychobela minimarus is a species of sea snail, a marine gastropod mollusk in the family Pseudomelatomidae, the turrids and allies.

Description
The length of the shell attains 14.3 mm, its diameter 4.5 mm.

Distribution
This marine species is endemic to Australia and occurs off Western Australia; also found off Hainan Island, China.

References

 Kosuge, S. 1993. Report on the family Turridae collected along the northwestern coast of Australia. Bulletin of the Institute of Malacology, Tokyo 6 3: 10-15

External links
 
  Baoquan Li 李宝泉 & R.N. Kilburn, Report on Crassispirinae Morrison, 1966 (Mollusca: Neogastropoda: Turridae) from the China Seas; Journal of Natural History 44(11):699-740 · March 2010; DOI: 10.1080/00222930903470086

minimarus
Gastropods described in 1993
Gastropods of Australia